The Journal of Food Science and Technology is a bimonthly peer-reviewed scientific journal covering food science and food technology. It was established in 1964 and is published by Springer Science+Business Media on behalf of the Association of Food Scientists and Technologists of India, of which it is the official journal. The editor-in-chief is N. Bhaskar (Central Food Technological Research Institute). According to the Journal Citation Reports, the journal has a 2021 impact factor of 3.117 .

References

External links

Nutrition and dietetics journals
Biotechnology journals
Springer Science+Business Media academic journals
English-language journals
Publications established in 1964
Bimonthly journals